The 2020 World Athletics Half Marathon Championships, originally scheduled for 29 March 2020 in Gdynia, Poland, was postponed until 17 October 2020, due to the coronavirus pandemic.

On , the mass participation race was cancelled, while the elite championships remained scheduled.

Medalists

Race results

Men

Women

Team standings

Men

Women

References

World Athletics Half Marathon Championships
International athletics competitions hosted by Poland
Sports competitions in Poland
IAAF World Half Marathon Championships
World Athletics Half Marathon Championships
Half Marathon Championships, 2020 World Athletics